Curramore may refer to the following places in Australia:

Curramore, New South Wales, locality in New South Wales
Curramore, Queensland, locality in Queensland
Curramore Sanctuary, nature reserve in the above locality